Michael Cummings (born November 28, 1945) is an American artist and quilter who lives in Harlem, New York.

Early life
Cummings grew up in Los Angeles, California, and earned a BA in American Art History at Empire College. He moved to New York in the early 1970s to take a position with the Department of Cultural Affairs for New York City. He worked with event planner Karin Bacon. Cummings spent his early artistic career as a part-time collage (Romare Bearden was a mentor) and paint artist.

After a work project to create a cloth banner for an exhibition in 1973, Cummings discovered his love for working with fabric and taught himself to quilt by studying the works of local quilters and how-to quilt magazines and books.

Cummings was in a pilot program that created the Studio in a School program in the 1970s. Philanthropist Agnes Gund funded the program and visited the artists many times.

Cummings also worked at the New York Council on the Arts for many years before retiring.

Quilting style and career
Cummings quilts in the narrative, story-telling tradition and is one of a few nationally known male quiltmakers. His work often features bright, colorful African themes and African American historical themes. Major quilt series include the "African Jazz" series (1990), the "Haitian Mermaid" series (1996), and the "Josephine Baker" series (2000).

The U.S. State Department has posted several of Cummings' quilts in its embassies (Rwanda and Mali) through its Arts in Embassy program. Brands such as Absolut Vodka and HBO have commissioned his work, and his quilts appear in the permanent collection of the Museum of Arts and Designs in New York. Whoopi Goldberg and Bill Cosby collect Cummings' quilts.

Notable works in public collections
 The Schomburg Center for Research in Black Culture, NYPL
 International Quilt Study Center & Museum Quilt House, University of Nebraska-Lincoln (Young Obama + Slave Ship...Henrietta Marie)
 Museum of Art, Michigan State University (African Jazz)
 Museum of Spirits, Stockholm, Sweden (Absolut Jazz)
 Brooklyn Museum, New York, NY (President Obama)
 Museum of Art and Design, New York, NY (I'll Fly Away)
 California African American Museum, Los Angeles, CA (Springtime in Memphis)
 Renwick Gallery (Smithsonian Institution) Washington, D.C. (Haitian Mermaid)
 Underground Railroad Freedom Center, Cincinnati, OH (Harriet Tubman...Leading family to freedom)

Women of Color Quilters Network
Cummings is a founding member of the Women of Color Quilters Network founded by Carolyn L. Mazloomi.

Works illustrated
 In the Hollow of Your Hand - Alice McGill author, Michael Cummings illustrator

Books that include Cummings' quilts
 Spirits of the Cloth by Carolyn Mazloomi (1987)
 Always There: The African American Presence in American Quilts''' by Cuesta Benberry (1992)
 American Quiltmaking: 1970-2000 by Eleanor Levie (2004)
 Contemporary Quilt Art by Kate Lenkowsky (2008)
 Masters: Art Quilts: Major Works by Leading Artists by Martha Sielman (2008)
 Art Quilt Portfolio: The Natural World by Martha Sielman (2012)
 Tragic Soul-Life by Terrence L. Johnson (2012) - jacket cover
 Art Quilt Portfolio: People & Portraits by Martha Sielman (2013)
 Patchwork & Stitching (2016) - Australian publication
 Quilts and Human Rights'' by Macdowell, Worrall, Swanson, and Donaldson (2016)

References

External links
 Official website
 Women of Color Quilters Network
 https://libguides.nypl.org/Michael_Cummings

1945 births
20th-century African-American people
21st-century African-American people
African-American artists
American artists
Living people
Quilters